"Don't Forget My Love" is a song by American DJ and record producer Diplo and American singer Miguel. It was released on February 11, 2022, via Higher Ground Records from Diplo's self-titled fourth studio album. The song was written by Diplo, Miguel, Bas van Daalen, Jasper Helderman and Maximilian Jaeger, and produced by Diplo and Maximilian Jaeger. Diplo also released this as a music NFT sharing streaming revenues with owners. The song received a nomination for Best Dance/Electronic Recording at the 65th Annual Grammy Awards.

Composition
The song is written in the key of D major, with a tempo of 121 beats per minute.

Track listing

Charts

Weekly charts

Year-end charts

Certifications

Release history

References

2022 songs
2022 singles
Diplo songs
Miguel (singer) songs
Songs written by Diplo
Songs written by Miguel (singer)
Song recordings produced by Diplo